The Accra Institute of Technology (AIT), is an independent technology-focused research university based in Accra, Ghana. The university comprises six schools and three institutes. 

The university is modeled on internationally renowned institutes of technology like the Massachusetts Institute of Technology (MIT) and the California institute of Technology (CALTECH) - both universities are consistently ranked in the top ten of the global rankings of universities worldwide. 

AIT is equally a leading research university in Ghana with over 250 enrolled on its PhD programs.

Accreditation 

AIT is accredited by the National Accreditation Board (Ghana), of the Ministry of Education in Ghana to offer  campus-based and open university programs in various fields. The campus-based programs are offered at the undergraduate level in engineering, computer science, information technology and business administration.

Collaborations, affiliations, and partnerships

Academic 

 Kwame Nkrumah University of Science and Technology (KNUST)
 Massachusetts Institute of Technology (MIT), USA
 Open University Malaysia
 AIT Learning Management System forming part of LEMSAS formally known as  LeMASS – an online academic program delivery and administrative system
 MIT OpenCourseware system – provide access to lecture notes, handouts and other learning resources of 1800 courses offered at MIT OpenCourseWare
 Open University Malaysia (OUM) Learning Management System – myLMS hosting learning materials and resources to be accessed by AIT students registered on the OUM programs and
 AIT-Online – E-University learning support resources

Industrial 

 Council for Scientific and Industrial Research – Ghana
 Ministry of Communications, Ghana
 Office of the Head of the Civil Service, Ghana
 The Ghana Civil Aviation Authority
 OMATEK Computers (Nigeria)

References

External links 
 National Accreditation Board
 Accra Institute of Technology (AIT) – Campus-Based Site
 Accra Institute of Technology (AIT) – Open University Site

Education in Accra
Universities in Ghana
Educational institutions established in 2009
2009 establishments in Ghana